Amara  similata is a species of ground beetle native to Europe.

References

similata)
Beetles described in 1810
Beetles of Europe